Paul K. Moser (born 1957 in Bismarck, North Dakota) is an American philosopher who writes on epistemology and the philosophy of religion. Moser is Professor of Philosophy at Loyola University Chicago and a former editor of the American Philosophical Quarterly.

Critics have described Moser as a sceptic of natural theology and a reformed epistemologist. Moser has described himself as an evidentialist.

Works 

 Empirical Justification (1986, D Reidel)
 Human Knowledge (ed.) (1987, Oxford University Press)
 Divine Hiddenness: New Essays (ed.) (2001, Cambridge University Press)
 The Elusive God (2008, Cambridge University Press)
 Jesus and Philosophy: New Essays (ed.) (2009, Cambridge University Press)
 The Evidence for God: Religious Knowledge Reexamined (2010, Cambridge University Press)
 The Severity of God: Religion and Philosophy Reconceived (2013, Cambridge University Press)
 Understanding Religious Experience: From Conviction to Life's Meaning (2019, Cambridge University Press)
 The God Relationship: The Ethics for Inquiry about the Divine (2017, Cambridge University Press)
 The Divine Goodness of Jesus: Impact and Response (2021, Cambridge University Press)

See also
American philosophy
List of American philosophers

References 

1957 births
Living people
People from Bismarck, North Dakota
Vanderbilt University alumni
American philosophers
Christian philosophers
Philosophers of religion
American Christian theologians
Loyola University Chicago faculty